Joshua Pim defeated Ernest Lewis 2–6, 5–7, 9–7, 6–3, 6–2 in the All Comers' Final, but the reigning champion Wilfred Baddeley defeated Pim 4–6, 6–3, 6–3, 6–2 in the challenge round to win the gentlemen's singles tennis title at the 1892 Wimbledon Championships.

Draw

Challenge round

All comers' finals

Top half

Bottom half

References

External links

Gentlemen's Singles
Wimbledon Championship by year – Men's singles